Winnipeg, Manitoba, is subdivided in different ways for different purposes. The suburbs and neighbourhoods of Winnipeg take their names from former administrative districts, parishes, and geographic features.

City wards 

, the City of Winnipeg is subdivided into 15 electoral wards, each represented by an individual member of City Council. The 15 city wards are further subdivided into 230 neighbourhoods.

Under the City of Winnipeg Charter, the boundaries and the name of each ward of Winnipeg are to be established at least every 10 years by a report prepared by the Winnipeg Wards Boundaries Commission (WWBC). In December 2017, the WWBC published its final report on new ward boundaries for the city, to be made effective September 2018. The Commission made its recommendations in consideration of the changes in distribution of the city's population as per the 2016 census. The most significant changes were the elimination of the St. Charles ward and the creation of a new Waverley West ward.

The 15 wards are categorized into one of five community committees, which deal with local community issues. This includes:

 Assiniboia Community Committee
 Charleswood–Tuxedo–Whyte Ridge (Charleswood–Tuxedo before 1 March 2015)
Waverley West
 St. James–Brooklands–Weston (St. James–Brooklands before 1 March 2015; St. James before 1 April 2003)
 East Kildonan–Transcona Community Committee
 Elmwood–East Kildonan
 North Kildonan
 Transcona
 City Centre
 Daniel McIntyre
 Fort Rouge–East Fort Garry (Fort Rouge before April 1, 2003)
 River Heights–Fort Garry
 Lord Selkirk–West Kildonan Community Committee
 Mynarski
 Old Kildonan
 Point Douglas
 Riel
 St. Boniface
 St. Norbert–Seine River
 St. Vital

Community areas and neighbourhood clusters 

The City of Winnipeg has been subdivided into two levels of areas, or relative segments, developed by the Community Data Program of the national Canadian Community Economic Development Network, in partnership with the federal and provincial governments and local community organizations.

Community areas are the broader, less detailed level of areas, which allow for geographical analysis and comparisons, i.e. census data, as used by Statistics Canada. As of the 2016 census, Winnipeg is composed of 12 community areas. There is also a separate set of 72 community centre areas, defining the catchment areas of community centres.

Community areas are composed of the second level of areas, neighbourhood clusters (formerly "Neighbourhood Resource Networks" or NRN), which are used for planning and policy purposes by Manitoba Health and the Winnipeg Regional Health Authority (WRHA). As of the 2016 census, there are 23 neighbourhood clusters, composing the Winnipeg census division.

The neighbourhood clusters are in turn subdivided into the same 230 neighbourhoods that make up the city wards of Winnipeg. Many of these clusters, community areas, and neighbourhoods share names and locations with the wards; however, ward boundaries and neighbourhood boundaries do not always perfectly align with one another (For example, the St. James-Assiniboia community area extends further west but lesser east than the St. James ward).

For health planning, the WRHA also includes two relatively densely-populated rural municipalities that are located outside of Winnipeg: the RM of East St. Paul is included in River East, and West St. Paul in Seven Oaks.

Downtown and Inner City 

The Inner City was defined for planning purposes in the 1980s by the three-government Core Area Initiative.

Within the Inner City, the Downtown Winnipeg Zoning By-Law defines an area for regulation of downtown development, significantly smaller than the Downtown community area.

The Exchange District is a National Historic Site of Canada.

School divisions 

Winnipeg is divided into school divisions, further subdivided into wards represented by several school trustees.

 Louis Riel School Division
 Pembina Trails School Division
 River East Transcona School Division
 Seven Oaks School Division
 St. James–Assiniboia School Division
 Winnipeg School Division

Census subdivisions 

The city is contained in the Winnipeg census metropolitan area (CMA), including several other municipalities, and the smaller Winnipeg census division, which also includes the town of Headingley. The city itself is designated subdivision 11 040, further broken down into census tracts and, in turn, into dissemination areas.

Unicity 

Today's Winnipeg is the product of the City of Winnipeg Act of 1972, which incorporated a number of cities, towns, and rural municipalities into a single larger city (previously administered under the Metropolitan Corporation of Greater Winnipeg, since 1960) into an amalgamated unicity. Residents still refer to these historical communities:

 Charleswood (rural municipality)
 East Kildonan (city)
 Fort Garry (R.M.)
 Headingley (R.M., seceded from Unicity in 1993)
 North Kildonan (R.M.)
 Old Kildonan (R.M.)
 St. Boniface (city)
 St. James–Assiniboia (city)
 St. Vital (city)
 Transcona (city)
 Tuxedo (town)
 West Kildonan (city)
 Winnipeg (city)

References

Bibliography 
 Winnipeg Neighbourhood Area Characterization Boundaries (map)
 2009 Winnipeg Wards Boundaries Commission Final Report

Neighbourhoods in Winnipeg
Geography of Winnipeg